USC&GS Hilgard (ASV 82). was a survey ship that served in the United States Coast and Geodetic Survey from 1942 to 1967.

Hilgard was built as an "auxiliary survey vessel" (ASV) for the Coast and Geodetic Survey by Robinson Marine at Benton Harbor, Michigan, in 1942.

Hilgard and her sister ship USC&GS Wainwright (ASV 83) conducted wire-drag hydrographic survey operations together along the United States East Coast until 1967, when they were replaced by USC&GS Rude (ASV 90), which later became NOAAS Rude (S 590), and USC&GS Heck (ASV 91), which later became NOAAS Heck (S 591).

See also
 Other ships built by Robinson Marine in Benton Harbor, Michigan:
 USS PGM-2
 USC&GS Wainwright (ASV 83)

References

NOAA History, A Science Odyssey: Tools of the Trade: Ships: Coast and Geodetic Survey Ships: Hilgard

Ships of the United States Coast and Geodetic Survey
Survey ships of the United States
Ships built in Benton Harbor, Michigan
1942 ships